Aatu Laatikainen (born 3 January 1997) is a Finnish professional footballer who plays as a midfielder.

References

1997 births
Living people
Finnish footballers
Kuopion Palloseura players
Vaasan Palloseura players
Veikkausliiga players
Association football midfielders